Lecananthus is a genus of flowering plants belonging to the family Rubiaceae.

Its native range is Western Malesia.

Species:

Lecananthus erubescens 
Lecananthus peduncularis 
Lecananthus pentander

References

Rubiaceae
Rubiaceae genera